Erik Seidel (born November 6, 1959) is an American professional poker player from Las Vegas, Nevada, who has won nine World Series of Poker bracelets and a World Poker Tour title. In 2010, he was inducted into the Poker Hall of Fame.

Early life
Seidel was born in New York City. He played professional backgammon in his youth. He eventually became a trader on the American stock exchange stock market, and then moved on to poker.

Seidel was one of the group of now famous players from the former Mayfair Club in New York City, including Stu Ungar, Jay Heimowitz, Mickey Appleman, Howard Lederer, Jason Lester, Steve Zolotow, Paul Magriel, and Dan Harrington.

Poker career

World Series of Poker
In his first major poker tournament, Seidel was runner-up in the 1988 World Series of Poker Main Event to Johnny Chan. This final hand was featured in the 1998 movie Rounders. Seidel made the WSOP Main Event final table again in 1999, finishing in fourth place in the event won by Noel Furlong.

Seidel won his first WSOP bracelet in 1992 and won his ninth and most recent bracelet in 2021. Seidel has won bracelets in five different games, including Hold'em, Omaha, and Deuce to Seven Draw. Only four players in the history of the WSOP have won more bracelets than Seidel: Phil Hellmuth, Doyle Brunson, Johnny Chan, and Phil Ivey.

World Poker Tour
During the sixth season of the World Poker Tour (WPT), Seidel won the 2008 WPT Foxwoods Poker Classic, earning $992,890.

In April 2011, Seidel came just short of winning his second WPT title at the Hollywood Open. He finished as the runner-up and won $155,103.

European Poker Tour
In May 2015, Seidel won the 2015 European Poker Tour Grand Final €100,000 Super High Roller for €2,015,000.

Other poker ventures
In January 2007, Seidel finished in second place in the Aussie Millions $100,000 event and took home $550,000(AUD), beaten by Erick Lindgren in Heads-Up play when he moved all-in with KJ of hearts on a two-heart flop and Lindgren called with a pair of aces and his 7 kicker became an eventual straight.

In January 2008, Seidel finished in second place in the Aussie Millions $10,000 main event and won $1,000,000(AUD).

In March 2010, Seidel finished in second place in the National Heads-Up Poker Championship and collected $250,000 after a 2–1 loss to Annie Duke in the final.

In January 2011, Seidel finished in fourth place in the PokerStars Caribbean Adventure High Roller Event for $295,960, then went on later that month to take 3rd in a A$100,000 buy-in Aussie Millions tournament for $618,139. Just five days later, Seidel pocketed $2,472,555 when he won the Super High Roller Event at the Aussie Millions.

In February 2011, Seidel won the High Roller Event at the LA Poker Classic for $144,570.

In March 2011, Seidel won the National Heads-Up Poker Championship, defeating 2003 World Champion Chris Moneymaker in the final. The $750,000 he collected for the win moved him into first place on the all-time tournament money list.

In May 2011, Seidel won the $100K Super High Roller event at the WPT World Championship for $1,092,780. He defeated fellow Team Full Tilt member Erick Lindgren heads up for the title.

In August 2011, Seidel finished runner-up to David Rheem in the $20,000 buy-in 6-Max No Limit Hold'em tournament at the inaugural Epic Poker League for $604,330, which brought his earnings for 2011 to over $6.2 million.

Seidel mentored journalist Maria Konnikova, starting in 2016, teaching her poker and the mindset that it requires. Seidel taught Konnikova Texas Hold'em and eventually she participated in tournaments and won $350,000. In 2020, Konnikova published a book about her experience: The Biggest Bluff: How I Learned to Pay Attention, Master Myself, And Win.

Career earnings

As of January 2019, his total live tournament winnings exceed $34,600,000 of which $5,388,532 have been won at the WSOP. His 101 WSOP cashes rank him second all-time. Erik has won over $5,000,000 in poker earnings in years 2011, 2015, and 2016. As of January 2017, while many players have made over $5 million in a year no other player has done this more than once. In January 2016, Seidel was ranked #28 on the Global Poker Index. (He was #1 for a total of 15 weeks in 2011).

As of April 2022, Seidel's total live tournament winnings exceed $39,200,000 making him #4 on the all-time money list.

World Series of Poker bracelets
Seidel has won nine WSOP bracelets in his storied poker career. His nine bracelets are tied for fifth all-time.

An "O" following a year denotes bracelet(s) won during the World Series of Poker Online

Personal life 
Seidel is married and has two daughters, Elian and Jamesin.

References

External links

 PokerListings biography

1959 births
American backgammon players
20th-century American Jews
American poker players
Living people
Sportspeople from New York City
People from the Las Vegas Valley
World Poker Tour winners
World Series of Poker bracelet winners
National Heads-Up Poker Championship winners
Poker Hall of Fame inductees
21st-century American Jews